Edward Beckwith may refer to:
 Edward Griffin Beckwith (1818–1881), United States Army officer
 Edward Pierrepont Beckwith (1877–1966), American engineer and explorer